Valery Ivanovich Tereshchenko (also V. J. Tereshtenko) (13 June 1901 – 28 September 1994) was a Russian−Soviet academic and writer in the fields of management.

History
He was born in Ekaterinodar (now – Krasnodar), Imperial Russia, the son of deputy district judge. In Ekaterinodar he graduated from high school and conservatory, and in Prague graduated from the Department of Economics of the Czech Technical University and Institute for Agricultural Cooperation, where he taught in the latter 1920s.

American period
In 1930 moved to the United States, and graduated from Columbia University in New York. Later he became a professor at Columbia, where he taught management courses.

He worked in the U.S. Department of Agriculture, at a Wall Street firm, and was a counsellor of the American businessman Roswell Garst.

In 1937, sponsored by the U.S. Department of Labor, Tereshchenko organized and led a large (160 employees) research project to study the world's literature on cooperatives, which was published 12 languages. The work was conducted in close collaboration with the Co-operative League of America, the International Cooperative Alliance in London, the International Labour Office in Geneva, and the Rockefeller Committee for Relations with South America. The Library of Congress assessed  the materials collected by project as ‘the most complete in the world’ at that time. The Fundamental Project Edition 'Summaries of  laws on cooperatives in the U.S.’ was used to revise the cooperative laws in some states. In this regard, in April 1940 Valeriy Tereshchenko was invited to Committee of the Senate on cooperatives legislation.

He along with other employees of the project took part in the establishment of initial economic ties between the U.S. and the Republic of China (1942−1949).

Before the end of World War II, the scientist was elected to the Executive Committee of the International Cooperative postwar reconstruction (NY). He participated in the preparation the United Nations Conferences on Food and Agriculture in Atlantic City and Hot Springs.

In the 1940s he was invited to organize a section on cooperative in the Latin American Institute in Boston, he was initiator of the first ever visit delegation of cooperators South America to the United States.

Soviet period
After the Second World War Tereshchenko came to the USSR for business trips, to help to establish trade and economic ties with the U.S.  In 1946 he was chief economist UNRRA in Ukraine.

Returning to the Soviet Union−Ukraine, and lived in Kyiv since 1963. Here he worked in a number of research institutes – of Ministry of Agricultural Economics and of the Ukrainian Academy of Science, and taught at the Taras Shevchenko National University of Kyiv.

He was given an honorary award by UNESCO, and awarded an honorary diploma by the Missouri Writers' Guild in the U.S.

Valeriy Ivanovich Tereshchenko died 28 September 1994, buried in Kyiv, the Baikove Cemetery.

Works
He is author of over 170 books, papers and articles in periodical on the management problems, which were printed in the United States, Argentina, Bulgaria, India, Canada, Germany, Peru, Poland, Czechoslovakia, Switzerland. In 1970 a Moscow company published a reduced version of the multi-volume American "Executive Leadership Course" (Englewood Cliffs, N.J.: Prentice-Hall, Inc., 1963) edited by Valeriy Tereshchenko.

He was a lecturer, with thousands of public lectures given in the U.S., Europe, and the Soviet Union. His later works included ‘The choice problem: policy of research priorities in the West’, ‘The science of management’, and ‘All about cooperation’, which was written when he was almost 90 years of age and published in Kyiv .

Books and publications 
 The problem of cooperative medicine - New York, 1940
  Cooperative Education – New York, 1941 
 Bibliographical review of literature on legal phases of cooperation - Washington, 1941
 American-Soviet Trade Relations: Past and Future & Economic Background for the Post-War International Trade of... - New York, 1945, with V. P. Timoshenko.
  Industrial cooperative in the Post-War Ukraine (Published in The American Slavic and East European review; 10.1951, 1, 26-37)
  Industrial cooperatives in the Ukrainian S.S.R. (Published in Annals of collective economy: international review in four editions; 22.1951, 2, 205-212)

See also
 Management consultant
 
 

Management consultants
Soviet academics
1901 births
1994 deaths
Academic staff of the Taras Shevchenko National University of Kyiv
Columbia University alumni
People from Krasnodar
Burials at Baikove Cemetery
Valeriy
Soviet emigrants to the United States
American emigrants to the Soviet Union